Frederick David Whelpton (11 March 1885 – 28 January 1965) was  a former Australian rules footballer who played with St Kilda, Essendon and Melbourne in the Victorian Football League (VFL).

Notes

External links 

1885 births
1965 deaths
Australian rules footballers from Melbourne
St Kilda Football Club players
Essendon Football Club players
Melbourne Football Club players
People from Richmond, Victoria